Marjan Pečar (27 January 1941 – 1 August 2019) was a Slovenian ski jumper. He competed in the normal hill and large hill events at the 1968 Winter Olympics.

References

1941 births
2019 deaths
Slovenian male ski jumpers
Olympic ski jumpers of Yugoslavia
Ski jumpers at the 1968 Winter Olympics
People from the Municipality of Kranjska Gora